In mathematics, Nesbitt's inequality states that for positive real numbers a, b and c,

It is an elementary special case (N = 3) of the difficult and much studied Shapiro inequality, and was published at least 50 years earlier.

There is no corresponding upper bound as any of the 3 fractions in the inequality can be made arbitrarily large.

Proof

First proof: AM-HM inequality

Clearing denominators yields

from which we obtain

by expanding the product and collecting like denominators.  This then simplifies directly to the final result.

Second proof: Rearrangement
Suppose , we have that 

define

The scalar product of the two sequences is maximum because of the rearrangement inequality if they are arranged the same way, call  and  the vector  shifted by one and by two, we have:

Addition yields our desired Nesbitt's inequality.

Third proof: Sum of Squares 
The following identity is true for all 

Note: every rational inequality can be demonstrated by transforming it to the appropriate sum-of-squares identity, see Hilbert's seventeenth problem.

Fourth proof: Cauchy–Schwarz
Invoking the Cauchy–Schwarz inequality on the vectors  yields

which can be transformed into the final result as we did in the AM-HM proof.

Fifth proof: AM-GM
Let .  We then apply the AM-GM inequality to obtain the following

because 

which then simplifies to the final result.

Sixth proof: Titu's lemma
Titu's lemma, a direct consequence of the Cauchy–Schwarz inequality, states that for any sequence of  real numbers  and any sequence of  positive numbers , .  

This gives,

This results in,
     i.e.,

Seventh proof:  Using homogeneity 
As the left side of the inequality is homogeneous, we may assume . The desired inequality turns into , or, equivalently, . This is clearly true by Titu's Lemma.

Eighth proof: Jensen inequality
Define  and consider the function .

A straightforward computation yields

Ninth proof: Reduction to a two-variable inequality
By clearing denominators,

As  we are done.

References 
 
 Ion Ionescu, Romanian Mathematical Gazette, Volume XXXII (September 15, 1926 - August 15, 1927), page 120

External links
 See AoPS for more proofs of this inequality.
 
 

Inequalities